Methacryloyl chloride is the acid chloride of methacrylic acid. It is used to manufacture polymers.

See also
 Acryloyl chloride

References

Acyl chlorides